General Lyon may refer to:

People
Edwin Bowman Lyon (1892–1971), U.S. Air Force major general
Hylan B. Lyon (1836–1907), Confederate States Army brigadier general
James Frederick Lyon ((1775–1842), British Army lieutenant general
LeRoy Springs Lyon (1866–1920), U.S. Army major general
Nathaniel Lyon (1818–1861), Union Army brigadier general
Robert Lyon (British Army officer) (1923–2019), British Army major general
William Lyon (general) (1923–2020), U.S. Air Force major general

Ships
 American steamship General Lyon (1864), steamship used as a transport in the American Civil War
 USS General Lyon (1860), steamboat that saw active service in the American Civil War

See also
General Lyons (disambiguation)